Goodwin may refer to:

Names
 Goodwin (surname), people with the surname
 Goody Rosen (born Goodwin Rosen; 1912–1994), Canadian Major League Baseball All Star outfielder
 Goodwin Liu (born 1970), American lawyer and politician
 Goodwin Knight (1896–1970), American politician, 31st Governor of California
 Goodwin Tutum Anim, Ghanaian journalist

Places
 Goodwin, Alberta, a locality in Canada
 Goodwin Island, Nunavut, Canada
 Goodwin's (Station), now Brookhaven, Georgia, United States
 Goodwin, Nebraska, United States
 Goodwin Sands, a sandbank in the English Channel
 Goodwin, South Dakota, United States
 Goodwin, West Virginia, United States
 Lake Goodwin, Washington, United States
 Goodwins, the original name of the Yorkshire Trading Company, United Kingdom

Other uses
 FL Goodwin, an American manufacturer of powered parachute aircraft
 Goodwin & Company, a tobacco manufacturer
 Goodwin College, East Hartford, Connecticut
 Goodwin Field, a stadium in Fullerton, California
 Goodwin Fire, a major wildfire that burned 20,000+ acres near Mayer, Arizona
 Goodwin Heart Pine, a reclaimed wood flooring manufacturer
 Goodwin Procter, LLP, an American law firm
 Goodwin Sports Centre, a sports facility in Sheffield, England

See also
 Godwin (disambiguation)
 Justice Goodwin (disambiguation)